Steve Davis (March 14, 1929 – August 21, 1987) (also known by his Muslim name Luquman Abdul Syeed) was a jazz bassist who is best known for his time in the John Coltrane Quartet from 1960 to 1961.

In 1960, Davis was briefly part of the John Coltrane Quartet, before being replaced temporarily by Reggie Workman and permanently by Jimmy Garrison Davis recorded My Favorite Things (1961) with the quartet.

He also recorded as a sideman with Chuck and Gap Mangione on Hey Baby! (1961), and with quartet fellow (and brother-in-law) McCoy Tyner on the 1963 album Nights of Ballads & Blues.

Discography
With John Coltrane
My Favorite Things (Atlantic, 1961)
Coltrane Jazz (Atlantic, 1961)
Coltrane Plays the Blues (Atlantic, 1962)
Coltrane's Sound (Atlantic, 1964)
With Kenny Dorham
The Flamboyan, Queens, NY, 1963 (Uptown, 2009)
With Eddie Jefferson
Body and Soul (Prestige, 1968)With Freddie McCoySpider Man (Prestige, 1965)
Peas 'n' Rice (Prestige, 1967)With James MoodyCookin' the Blues (Argo, 1961)With The Jazz Brothers Featuring Gap Mangione and Chuck MangioneHey Baby! (Riverside, 1961)With McCoy Tyner'Nights of Ballads & Blues (Impulse, 1963)

References
 Leonard Feather & Ira Gitler, The Biographical Encyclopedia of Jazz.'' Oxford/New York 1999;

Notes

1929 births
1987 deaths
Jazz bass guitarists
Place of birth missing
20th-century American bass guitarists
20th-century double-bassists